Alberto Hernández (born January 13, 1917) is a Cuban former Negro league outfielder. 

A native of Jovellanos, Cuba, Hernández played for the New York Cubans in 1941. He went on to play in the Mexican League into the mid-1940s.

References

External links
 and Seamheads

1917 births
Possibly living people
New York Cubans players
Baseball outfielders
People from Matanzas Province
Pericos de Puebla players
Cuban expatriate baseball players in the United States
Cuban expatriate baseball players in Mexico